The King of Paris may refer to:

 The King of Paris (1917 film)
 The King of Paris (1923 film)
 The King of Paris (1930 French-language film)
 The King of Paris (1930 German film)
 The King of Paris (1934 film)